State Route 150 (SR 150) is a  state highway that travels southwest–to–northeast through portions of McDuffie and Columbia counties in the east-central part of the U.S. state of Georgia. It travels from Thomson northeast to the South Carolina state line, southwest of Clarks Hill, South Carolina.

Route description

McDuffie County 

SR 150 begins at an intersection with SR 17 (Main Street) in Thomson. It heads northeast to an intersection with US 78/SR 10/SR 17 Byp. (Thomson Bypass), just before leaving the city. Northeast of Thomson is an interchange with Interstate 20 (I-20; Carl Sanders Highway). Between I-20 and the unincorporated community of Pollards Corner, SR 150 travels along the McDuffie–Columbia county line.

Columbia County 
It continues to the northeast to a five-way intersection in Pollards Corner with U.S. Route 221 (US 221) and the western terminus of SR 104 (Washington Road), SR 47 splits off to travel concurrently with US 221 south, while SR 150 splits off to travel concurrent with US 221 north. SR 150 follows US 221 until they reach the South Carolina state line, where US 221 crosses over the Clarks Hill Dam and continues northeast to Clarks Hill. From Thomson to Pollards Corner, SR 150 is known as Cobbham Road.

Major intersections

See also

List of highways numbered 150

References

External links

 Georgia Roads (Routes 141 - 160)

150
Transportation in McDuffie County, Georgia
Transportation in Columbia County, Georgia